Metskannikesed is a 1980 Estonian action film directed by Kaljo Kiisk.

Awards, nominations, participations:
 1980: Soviet Estonia Film Festival (USSR), first prize to Tõnu Virve being the best film artist; first prize to Tõnu Kark, being the best male actor
 1980: All-Union Film Festival, best cinematographer: Jüri Sillart

Plot

Cast
 Tõnu Kark as Rein
 Rudolf Allabert as Andres
 Aarne Üksküla as Juhan
 Enn Klooren as Kristjan
 Robert Gutman as Kalev
 Arvo Kukumägi as Tõnu
 Sulev Luik as Sander
 Jüri Järvet as Apothecary Lipp
 Tõnu Mikiver as Anti
 Tõnu Saar as Lauri

References

External links
 
 Metskannikesed, entry in Estonian Film Database (EFIS)

1980 films
Estonian action films
Estonian-language films